Alexander W. Joel is the first Civil Liberties Protection Officer for the U.S. Office of the Director of National Intelligence. He was appointed to the position by Director John Negroponte on December 7, 2005.

Biography

Alex Joel entered public service following the events of September 11. He joined the Central Intelligence Agency's Office of General Counsel in October 2002, where he provided legal advice relating to intelligence activities. Prior to his employment by the CIA, Mr. Joel served as the privacy, technology, and e-commerce attorney for Marriott International, Inc., where he helped engineer and deploy Marriott's global privacy compliance program, including the creation of their first privacy officer position. Before that, he worked as a technology attorney at the law firm of Shaw, Pittman, Potts & Trowbridge in Washington, D.C. (now Pillsbury Winthrop Shaw Pittman), and for four years as a U.S. Army Judge Advocate General Corps officer, as both prosecutor and defense attorney.

Education

Mr. Joel received his B.A. degree from Princeton University in 1984, magna cum laude. He received his law degree from the University of Michigan in 1987, magna cum laude, where he was a member of the Michigan Law Review.

See also
Civil Liberties Protection Officer

External links
Office of the Director of National Intelligence Mini-Biography
Wall Street Journal article
Bio from University of Virginia

Living people
American civil servants
Princeton University alumni
University of Michigan Law School alumni
Year of birth missing (living people)
People associated with Pillsbury Winthrop Shaw Pittman